Baildon Steelworks was a major steelworks in Katowice, Poland.  It was located in Katowice districts of Załęże and Dąb. Founded in 1823 (then in Prussian Silesia), it was a major local employer and a landmark until its liquidation in 2001.

It was named after Scottish engineer John Baildon.

It sponsored a major sports club, KS Baildon Katowice.

External links

 

Buildings and structures in Katowice
1823 establishments in Poland
Iron and steel mills in Poland
2001 disestablishments in Poland
Manufacturing companies established in 1823